Anna Maria Dossena (1912–1990) was an Italian stage and film actress.

Selected filmography
 Television (1931)
 The Old Lady (1932)
Music in the Square (1936)
 We Were Seven Sisters (1939)
 We Were Seven Widows (1939)
 Empty Eyes (1953)
 Il bambino e il poliziotto (1989)

References

Bibliography 
 Waldman, Harry. Missing Reels: Lost Films of American and European Cinema. McFarland, 2000.

External links 
 

1912 births
1990 deaths
Italian stage actresses
Italian film actresses